Highway M08 is the shortest Ukraine international highway. It serves as a loop route bypassing the city of Uzhhorod on the northern (mountainous) side.  It is part of European route E50 and European route E58.

It starts at a split of European routes E50 and E573 (village of Baranyntsi, Uzhhorod Raion) and ends at the Uzhhorod border checkpoint, which is located at vulytsia Sobranetska in Uzhhorod. Across the Slovak border, it continues as Slovakian Road I/50.

Route

See also

 Roads in Ukraine
 Ukraine Highways
 International E-road network
 Pan-European corridors
 :sk:Cesta I. triedy 50 (Slovensko)

References

External links
 National Roads in Ukraine in Russian
 European Roads in Russian

Roads in Zakarpattia Oblast
European route E50